is a district of Nerima, Tokyo, Japan. It consists of 1-chōme to 6-chōme. As of January 1, 2008, the district has a population of 25,969.

Geography
Minamiōizumi is located in the western portion of Nerima. It borders Higashiōizumi (across the Shirako River) on the east; Shakujiidai and Sekimachikita on the south; Fujimachi, Nakamachi, Higashichō and Shimohōya of Nishitōkyō on the west; and Nishiōizumi on the north.

Neighborhoods of Tokyo
Nerima